Outlands is a hamlet in the English county of Staffordshire. It lies 1 km eas of Bishop's Offley.

External links 

Hamlets in Staffordshire